Pancrudo is a municipality in the Teruel Community comarca, Teruel province, Aragon, Spain.
According to the 2010 census the municipality had a population of 136 inhabitants. Its postal code is 44720. Its distance from the provincial capital, Teruel is 56 kilometres.

The mayor of Pancrudo is Mr. Manuel Tolosa Sancho, of the ruling Partido Socialista Obrero Español. This party has 3 municipal councillors in the town's ayuntamiento, while the Partido Aragonés holds the remaining 2. In the 2004 Spanish General Election the Partido Socialista Obrero Español got 46.2% of the vote in Pancrudo, the Partido Popular got 43.0%, the Partido Aragonés got 4.3%, the Chunta Aragonesista, 3.2% and Izquierda Unida, 2.2%.

It is located at high altitude among the Sistema Ibérico mountains.

Villages
Pancrudo
Cervera de Pancrudo
Cuevas de Portalrubio 
Portalrubio

See also
Comunidad de Teruel
List of municipalities in Teruel

References

External links

CAI Aragon
Aerial view of Pancrudo (Google maps)

Municipalities in the Province of Teruel